Georgia State Route 10 Business may refer to:

 Georgia State Route 10 Business (Monroe): a business route of State Route 10 that partially exists in Monroe
 Georgia State Route 10 Business (Washington): a business route of State Route 10 that partially exists in Washington

010 Business